Urho is a Finnish male given name. It was most popular in the first half of the 20th century. As of 2013 there were more than 12,000 people registered with this name in Finland. The nameday is the 17th of June. It means "brave" or "courageous". A common variation is Urkki.

Some people who have this name include:

 Urho Castrén (1886–1965), a Finnish politician 
 Urho Karhumäki (1891–1947), a Finnish poet
 Urho Kekkonen (1900-1986), the eighth President of Finland
 Urho Kujala (born 1957), a Finnish orienteering competitor
 Urho Lehtovaara (1917-1949), a Finnish Air Force aces
 Urho Peltonen (1893–1951), a Finnish athlete 
 Urho Sirén (1932-2002), a Finnish cyclist
 Urho Tallgren (1894-1959), a Finnish long-distance runner
 Urho Teräs (1915–1990), a Finnish footballer
 Urho Vaakanainen (born 1999), a Finnish ice hockey player

See also
 Saint Urho
 Urkki, Finnish magazine established in reference to Urho Kekkonen

References 

Finnish masculine given names